The Russian invasion of East Prussia occurred during World War I, lasting from August to September 1914.  As well as being the natural course for the Russian Empire to take upon the declaration of war on the German Empire, it was also an attempt to focus the Imperial German Army on the Eastern Front, as opposed to the Western Front. Despite having an overwhelming superiority over the Germans in numbers, the invading Imperial Russian Army spread its forces thin and was defeated in the battles of Tannenberg and the Masurian Lakes, resulting in a complete strategic collapse of the Russian invasion.

The shock of the invasion served to assist the German war effort according to one historian, who argued that "Outrage at the violation of national territory and Tsarist atrocities strengthened German solidarity, cemented conviction in the righteousness of the national cause, and acted as a terrible and lasting warning of the penalties of defeat".

German planning
German strategy vis-à-vis Russia was defensive from 1888 onward, when the Chief of the German General Staff, Helmuth von Moltke, abandoned the concept of a decisive offensive into Russian territory and began to consider defensive options. According to German intelligence estimates, the railway network in Poland limited the Russians to three options: a purely defensive posture against Germany, an offensive down the Vistula straight towards Berlin or an invasion of East Prussia with two armies, one from the Narew and one from the Neman. French political pressure blocked the first option, while the second option was militarily unsound, leaving the third option as the most likely Russian course of action.

In 1894 Alfred von Schlieffen, then Chief of the German General Staff, war-gamed a scenario that corresponded to the Battle of Tannenberg in 1914. With the Russian Niemen army having overrun half of East Prussia, the German commander in the exercise exploited the separation between the Russian Narew and Niemen armies to mass his troops against the right flank of the Narew army and destroy the whole force. In the exercise critique Schlieffen said the Germans could easily just establish a defensive line behind the Vistula, but when the opportunity to destroy an entire Russian army was available, it should be taken.

Whereas Schlieffen's predecessor's Alfred von Waldersee's idea had been to launch a spoiling attack on the Russians as they deployed and then wait for reinforcements from the west, Schlieffen foresaw a mobile operation on interior lines using railways to mass forces against one Russian army and destroy it before it could retreat.  As a result, every German general staff officer in East Prussia in 1914 knew how to respond to the Russian offensive.

Comparison of strength
The invasion was led by two Russian armies: the First Army, which was commanded by General Paul von Rennenkampf and consisted of 6.5 infantry divisions, 5.5 cavalry divisions, 472 guns, 254 machine guns  (later 7 new reserve divisions arrived) and the Second Army under the command of General Alexander Samsonov, composed of 11 infantry divisions, 3 cavalry divisions, 724 guns, 434 machine guns. They were confronted by the German Eighth Army, commanded by General Maximilian von Prittwitz and consisting of 14.5 infantry divisions, 1 cavalry division, 774 guns, 396 machine guns. Each Russian division consisted of 16 battalions, the German -12. Russian and German battalions also differed in the number of personnel and weapons.

Although outnumbering the enemy, the Russian Army had numerous problems that contributed to its defeat: Russia was not prepared for a large war at the time and its rearmament programme was not completed, as was known to the Germans. Many soldiers were untrained, its transport service was largely ineffective and slowed down the movement of troops, its forces were spread out over a large territory and had little coordination with each other, allowing the enemy to engage each part of their army separately, like in the Battle of Tannenberg or the Battle of Stallupönen, and most importantly, its intelligence-gathering technique was greatly inferior to that of the Germans due to lack of reconnaissance units. The planning of the invasion was rushed in order to help France as quickly as possible and not well-thought out.

The German 8th Army also had numerous problems. Half of it consisted of newly drafted elderly reservists.
The German Empire last participated in a war in 1871, and the Russian Empire in 1905. Therefore, the German military had no combat experience, while the Russians mostly did. This was especially true of officers and senior military leadership, Generals Samsonov and Rennenkampf participated in the Russo-Japanese War. At the beginning of the war, the Russians had no problem with a shortage of weapons or ammunition, their armies were fully equipped with guns and machine guns. 
Thus the small German army, with commanders without modern combat experience and half-staffed by hastily assembled reservists, had to face off against vastly superior enemy armies with combat experience from the recent war with Imperial Japan.

Battle
However, quite quickly, Russia was able to mobilize an invasion into East Prussia. Any invasion of Prussia was an important blow to German morale as well as her general strategic situation. The German deployment on the outbreak of the war left only the 10 divisions of the German Eighth Army under General Maximilian von Prittwitz in East Prussia whereas the Russians had been able to mobilize the First Army, under General Paul von Rennenkampf and the Second Army, under General Alexander Samsonov.  They entered East Prussia on 7–9 August.

The Battle of Stallupönen, fought between Russian and German armies on 17 August, was the opening battle of World War I on the Eastern Front. It was a minor German success, but did little to upset the Russian timetables.

The Battle of Gumbinnen, started by the Germans on 20 August, was the first major offensive on the Eastern Front during the First World War. Due to the hastiness of the German attack the Russian army emerged victorious. The Germans were forced to retreat, perhaps with the intention of performing holding actions in Masuria, or even retreating to the Vistula River which would have meant abandoning the salient of East Prussia. This would have fitted in with the plans made before the start of the First World War; that these were the positions the Germans would retreat to if the Russians put up a much stronger fight than they had anticipated.  Regardless of whatever preparations had been made, however, it still remained that the Germans could not let the Prussian capital Königsberg fall into Russian hands.  The moral, symbolic and military value (since it was a major military hub) of the city meant to lose it was to invite disaster on the home front, in addition to the strategic ramifications.  Also, it was very likely that the Russians would have used the upper hand thus gained to use their superior forces to overwhelm the static German defenses. In short, the Germans had to fight back immediately and force the Russians from East Prussia.

The Russian supply situation was abysmal.  Short of food and artillery ammunition and incorrectly believing the Germans were in full retreat, Rennenkampf did not pursue, refitted for a couple days, and lost contact.  Instead of sticking to the plan and advancing south-westerly to link up with Samsonov, he instead slowly moved his First Army westerly.  Under pressure to advance and cut off the supposed German retreat, Samsonov's Second Army outdistanced their supplies resulting in hungry demoralized troops.

Prittwitz panicked when the Russian onslaught entered East Prussia and believed his army would be crushed between the pincers of the two Russian armies (as was the Russian plan).  He announced his intention of abandoning East Prussia and move behind the Vistula.  Helmuth von Moltke the Younger, Chief of the German General Staff from 1906 to 1914 replaced Prittwitz with Paul von Hindenburg (brought out of retirement) on 22 August.  Hindenburg, along with his chief of staff, the formidable Ludendorff, would approach the crisis in East Prussia very differently.  In contrast to Prittwitz, Hindenburg and Ludendorff decided to take the offensive and encircle Samsonov.  Following the plans of Colonel Max Hoffmann, Prittwitz's deputy chief of operations, they chose to wheel eight of their divisions counter-clockwise to attack Samsonov; taking advantage of interior lines and well-practiced ability to move quickly via the rail roads. The Battle of Tannenberg the losses of the Russian 2nd Army amounted to 120,219 KIA, WIA, MIA, the German 8th Army 13,058. The Second Army was destroyed and Samsonov shot himself. The Germans then forced the First and Tenth Armies to retreat out of East Prussia in the Battle of the Masurian Lakes.

The invasion was a ghastly failure for the Russians, a setback which was followed by considerable German advances in the following year, including the capture of the Polish city of Warsaw.  However, the crisis caused in the German High Command by the unexpected Russian advance forced the sending of 2 corps and a cavalry division from the Western Front as part of the new 9th Army in order to support the attack on the Russians.  These additional forces did not arrive in time for the twin battles as Ludendorff predicted and, had they entered France as originally planned, could have been tremendously helpful to the precarious situation in the West. In the head of French Intelligence Colonel Dupont's words, "their debacle was one of the elements of our victory."

Casualties and losses

According to the regimental lists of casualties and information from reports and logs of military operations, as well as information submitted later from the remnants of the formations that were surrounded, the units that were part of the 2nd Russian Army lost 220 officers and 5,302 soldiers killed before September 1914 (these are those who was taken out of the battlefield and buried by the Russian side), 542 officers and 11,784 soldiers were wounded (evacuated to Russia or admitted to field hospitals), missing (excluding two encircled corps) - 391 officers and 29,491 soldiers. In addition, according to reports from part of the encircled formations, the casualties in the 13th and 15th army corps on October 1 (by this time those who had fallen behind or escaped from the encirclement had practically ceased to return) amounted to 1,552 officers (of which, according to available information, 111 were killed, 143 wounded and 907 were missing or captured, there is no data on the rest, especially for those called up from the reserve) and 76,472 soldiers (of which 3,130 were killed, 2,412 were wounded, 44,646 were missing, there is no data on the rest, especially for those called up from the reserve). In the 15th Army Corps, for example, according to later reports, 2,978 were killed and 25,000 men were taken prisoner. In total, the damage of the 2nd Army, according to all surviving lists and reports, can be estimated at 2,451 officers and 117,768 soldiers.

Thus, together with the current figure of the corpses of Russian soldiers buried by the German side (6,789), the 2nd Army lost 13,590 killed. However, some of the dead could remain unburied. The number of wounded was probably higher, but it is rather difficult to take them into account: in a number of cases they were captured and are counted among the prisoners. In August 1914, 543 seriously wounded Russian soldiers entered the German hospitals, 8 of them died. The total number of prisoners of the 2nd Army announced by the Germans was 15 generals, 1,830 officers, 91,400 soldiers. So, out of the number of officers, 220 died, 542 were wounded and evacuated, 1,830 were captured. Of the soldiers of the 2nd Army, 13,370 definitely died, at least 11,784 were wounded and evacuated, 91,400 were captured; the fate of another 1,214 remains unknown (perhaps they deserted, and in part they could die from disease and hunger, hiding in the forests, or they could be among the wounded who were not included in the surviving lists).

For the entire East Prussian campaign, according to the lists of regiments and reports of the heads of divisions and brigades 1st Army, 275 officers and 9,347 soldiers were killed, 557 officers and 25,616 soldiers were wounded, 449 officers and 65,608 soldiers were missing, in total - 1,826 officers and 115,374 soldiers (including without indication casualty categories - 545 officers and 14,219 soldiers of the 54th and 72nd Infantry Divisions).The casualties of the 10th Army amounted to more than 3,000 men: 12 officers and 437 soldiers were killed, 54 officers and 1,788 soldiers were wounded, 13 officers and 1,416 soldiers were missing, a total of 79 officers and 3,557 soldiers. 

The German troops of the 8th Army in two months of fighting lost, according to sanitary reports, 3,867 dead (of which 247 officers), 7,053 missing (of which 39 officers), 21,987 wounded (a total of 32,907 combat casualties) and 23,168 patients, of which during the same time 20,415 men were returned to service.
Before the publication of the sanitary report, German researchers determined the casualties of the 8th Army in August 1914 as follows: 239 officers and 2902 soldiers were killed, 583 officers and 12,410 soldiers were wounded, 43 officers and 11,488 soldiers were missing, and in the First Battle of the Masurian Lakes was estimated at 9,000 men. In addition, the authors also mentioned casualties without categories - 800 men from the 3rd Reserve Division and 543 men from the 6th and 70th Landwehr Infantry Brigades.

The incompleteness of this information can also be overcome by using published nominal lists of casualties as a source. An analysis of these lists for August 1914-December 1916 gives the following figures: 409 officers and 6,647 soldiers were killed, 833 officers and 25,889 soldiers were wounded, 61 officers and 8,791 soldiers were missing and captured. In this case, this is the full composition of all the fighting units, including landstorm battalions serving in headquarters, sappers (pioneers), heavy artillery, medics, signalmen, pilots (15 men) and sailors of the river flotilla (two). Some discrepancy downwards in the number of those killed with the data of regimental histories is explained by the fact that their authors included those who died in captivity during the entire war and died from diseases among the dead.

The 2nd Russian Army took 55 soldiers prisoner in East Prussia and took them to Russia (the rest fled or were repulsed during the fighting), the 1st and 10th armies - 38 officers and 2,990 soldiers (of which 29 officers and 1,377 soldiers wounded, and so badly that 381 of them died before being sent to the camps). Given this information, the number of dead German soldiers may increase to almost 13,000 men (including 432 officers), and the number of missing people will decrease to the number of surviving prisoners (2,702 men). In any case, the combat casualties of the German troops in East Prussia reach 42,630 men, of which 1,303 are officers, which was 6 times less than the damage of the Russian armies operating against them.

In 2020, based on information from the Russian military archives, S. Nelipovich published the book "Two Campaigns. Struggle for East Prussia" (in Russian) with the casualties of the Russian army in East Prussia in 1914. S. Nelipovich took information on German casualties from the official German medical reports with lists of casualties by name.

The opinion of the Russian military about the German victory
Russian military researchers had a high opinion of the German victory in East Prussia. 

In the book "Cannes of the World War" about battle of Tannenberg (published in 1926 in Russian), the Soviet military leader and military theorist G. Isserson stated:

"World War 1914-1918 was not rich in skillful maneuvers and decisive battles.
The huge masses of the armed forces made the armies little mobile and little capable of decisive maneuvers, which distinguished the wars of the past.
The East Prussian operation in August 1914 is a rare exception in this respect during the 4-year war. In terms of the elegance of its maneuver, the decisiveness of the goal it achieved, and, finally, the infrequent in military history, the implementation of the complete encirclement of the enemy by forces almost inferior to him, the East Prussian operation of the 8th German army against the 2nd Russian is throughout not only the world war, but, perhaps, wars of the last centuries is a rare example of military art and deserves absolutely exceptional attention. In this battle, played out on a relatively insignificant front, between two separate armies, which had free flanks, and therefore freedom of maneuver, the strategic art of command was revealed with complete distinctness and is therefore of great instructive interest, the identification of which is the task of any military historical description.

If we, from this point of view, take a quick look at the balance of forces of the opponents in the East Prussian theater of operations at the beginning of the war of 1914, we will see that one German army consisting of 4 corps, one cavalry division and secondary formations, with a force of up to 3 divisions, it was opposed to two Russian armies consisting of 8 corps, two rifle brigades and 8.5 cavalry divisions, that is, it was more than twice inferior in number to them.
Evaluating then just as quickly the general strategic situation, we will see that, thanks to the protruding geographical outline of East Prussia, two Russian armies, far superior to the Germans, advancing from the east from the Neman and from the south from the Narew, took the weak German army in pincers , threatening her with coverage of both flanks. These favorable conditions, in which the Russian armies were located, are of such self-sufficient strategic importance that they are in no way compensated by the more developed network of railways and dirt roads in East Prussia and the more advanced equipment of its theater of operations, which, moreover, should be reckoned not to the position of the opposing armies assessed here, as such, but to the foresight of the Prussian General Staff in peacetime.

And yet, significantly inferior to the Russian side in terms of their numbers and strategic position, the Germans emerge victorious over both Russian armies, bringing the defeat of one of them to complete encirclement and destruction. The instructiveness of the actions of the victorious side in such difficult and dangerous conditions in this case is enormous; it should show us how, under incredibly difficult strategic conditions, a decisive victory over a numerically superior enemy is organized and achieved".

Gallery

See also
 Second Russian invasion of East Prussia (1914)

References

Bibliography

Further reading

Notes

Battles of World War I involving Russia
Battles of World War I involving Germany
East Prussia
Battles of the Eastern Front (World War I)
1914 in Germany
Conflicts in 1914
1914 in the Russian Empire
World War I invasions
Invasions of Germany
August 1914 events
September 1914 events
Germany–Russia relations